Jeanette Henriëtte Marcus (1891-1993) was a Dutch artist.

Biography 
Marcus was born on 9 June 1891 in Amsterdam. Her teachers included Carel Lodewijk Dake sr., Antoon Derkinderen, and Nicolaas van der Waay. Her work was included in the 1939 exhibition and sale Onze Kunst van Heden (Our Art of Today) at the Rijksmuseum in Amsterdam. She was a member of the Kunst zij ons doel in Haarlem. Marcus died on 2 November 1993 in Heemstede at the age of 102.

References

External links 
images of Marcus' work on RKD

1891 births
1993 deaths
Artists from Amsterdam
20th-century Dutch women artists